Peace Bridge (2007) is the fourth album from John & Mary, their first with the Valkyries.

Track listing
All tracks composed by John Lombardo and Mary Ramsey except where indicated
"Poppy" – 3:45
"Easter" – 3:42
"Shudder Girl" – 4:05
"The Gift of Life" – 3:55
"Goodbye Stan" (Lombardo) – 2:32
"Triumph" – 3:31
"23 Days" – 4:15
"Johnny and Mary" (Robert Palmer) – 3:37
"Autumn in Rio" – 3:54
"This Time Alone" (Lombardo) – 4:49
"That's Where I Went Wrong" (Terry Jacks) – 2:39
"Billy and Shelley" – 3:49
"Time Hard" (G. Agard) – 2:35

Personnel
John & Mary & the Valkyries
John Lombardo – acoustic guitar, vocal, producer, mixing, graphic design
Mary Ramsey – vocal, viola, violin, mixing
Patrick J. Kane – electric lead and rhythm guitar, mixing
Kent Weber – bass guitar (2-12)
Rob Lynch – drums (2,3,5-9,11,12)
Joe Rozler – keyboards (1-13), vocal (10,13), string arrangement (12)
Nelson Starr – keyboards (6,9,10), bass guitar (1,13), vocal (13)
Jerome Agustyniak – drums (1,4)

Additional musicians
Victor DeLorenzo – varied percussion (9)
Davey Moore – pennywhistle (3)
Charlie Quill – banjo (5)
Jimmy Burgess – trombone (10,13)
Loraine O'Donnell – vocal (7,11)
Kenny Petersen – pedal steel guitar (7,11)
Andrew Case – drums (13)
Gretchen Schulz – vocal (3)
John Allen – flute (9)
Greg Gizzi – drums (10)
Armand John Petri – tambourine (9)
David Schulz – organ (4)
Jonathan Golove – cello (12)

Technical staff
Dwane Hall – engineer, mixing
Rob Price – production

References 
Liner notes from John & Mary & the Valkyries: Peace Bridge.

John & Mary albums
2007 albums